Elegushi Beach is a private beach located at Lekki, Lagos state, southwest  Nigeria. The beach is owned by the Elegushi royal family in Lekki, Lagos state. Elegushi private beach is seen as one of the best beaches in Lagos and Nigeria at large. The beach entertains close to 40,000 guests every week with Sundays being the best day on the beach. Over half of all guests that are entertained on the beach weekly visit on Sundays. Their gate pass is at 2000 naira flat rate but can be discounted if you have like a group. Their official IG handle can be used to reach them.

Gallery

References

Beaches of Lagos